Cyclope is a genus of sea snails, marine gastropod mollusks in the family Nassariidae, the Nassa mud snails or dog whelks.

This genus has become a synonym of Tritia Risso, 1826 .

Species
Species brought into synonymy 
 Cyclope donovania Risso, 1826: synonym of Tritia pellucida Risso, 1826
 Cyclope donovani Bucquoy, Dautzenberg & Dollfus, 1882: synonym of Tritia pellucida Risso, 1826
 Cyclope donovania [sic] : synonym of Cyclope pellucida Risso, 1826: synonym of Tritia pellucida Risso, 1826
 Cyclope neritea (Linnaeus, 1758): synonym of Tritia neritea (Linnaeus, 1758)
 Cyclope neritoidea Risso, 1826 (Unnecessary substitute name for Buccinum neriteum Linnaeus, 1758): synonym of Tritia neritea (Linnaeus, 1758)
 Cyclope pellucida Risso, 1826: synonym of Tritia pellucida (Risso, 1826)
 Cyclope tarentina Parenzan, 1970 : synonym of Tritia neritea (Linnaeus, 1758)
 Cyclope westerlundi Brusina, 1900: synonym of Tritia neritea (Linnaeus, 1758)

Nomenclature
It was placed on the Official List of Generic Names in Zoology by ICZN opinion 793. Its grammatical gender was ruled as feminine by this opinion, the name was inconsistently treated as feminine in the combination C. neritoidea and masculine in the combination C. pellucidus by Risso (1826).

References

 Montfort P. [Denys de] (1810) Conchyliologie systématique, et classification méthodique des coquilles [...]. Vol. 2: pp. 676 + 16. Paris: Schoelle
 Gofas, S.; Le Renard, J.; Bouchet, P. (2001). Mollusca, in: Costello, M.J. et al. (Ed.) (2001). European register of marine species: a check-list of the marine species in Europe and a bibliography of guides to their identification. Collection Patrimoines Naturels, 50: pp. 180–213

Gastropod genera
Nassariidae